Laura Coleman (b. c. 1986) is an English model, social media influencer and actress represented by MODELS 1. At Age 22, Coleman won the Miss England 2008 beauty pageant and represented England at Miss World.

Biography
Born in Melton Mowbray, Coleman comes from a family of models and beauty pageant winners. Her maternal grandmother Irene won 12 titles and became Miss Army Pin-Up and Miss Lovely Legs in the 1940s. Her mother Dena won 20 titles in her 20s, including Miss East Anglia and was a finalist in the Miss United Kingdom.

Coleman won the title of Miss Leicestershire in 2005 while studying for a degree in business law and marketing at De Montfort University in Leicester, and came fourth in Miss England that year.

Laura won Miss Derby in 2008 and went on to win Miss England on her second attempt on 18 July 2008, just a day after her graduation. Coleman then represented England in Miss World 2008, in South Africa.

Laura is currently living in London and represented by Models 1 model agency. 
Laura is a social media influencer for sustainable brands and vintage fashion  on Instagram.

Coleman has appeared in several feature films including Guy Ritchie’s King Arthur: Excalibur Rising (2017) and The Witches of Dumpling Farm (2018.)

References

External links
Miss England official website

1986 births
Living people
People from Melton Mowbray
Alumni of De Montfort University
English female models
Miss England winners
Miss World 2008 delegates
21st-century English women
21st-century English people